Jeffrey McLaughlin may refer to:
 Jeffrey McLaughlin (politician), Alabama politician
 Jeffrey McLaughlin (rower) (born 1965), American rower